Mike Romano is an American politician and former Democratic member of the West Virginia Senate, having representing the 12th district from 2014 to 2022. Prior to his election to the Senate, Romano was a county commissioner in Harrison County. In 2022, Romano retired from the Senate to run for Harrison County commissioner again, but was defeated by incumbent David Hinkle.

Election results

2018: After running in the 2018 Democratic Primary unopposed, Romano faced small business owner Waymond Cork in the November general election. Romano beat Cork 55-45% to earn a second term.

2014: Harrison County Commissioner Mike Romano challenged appointed-incumbent Senator Sam Cann in the May 13, 2014 Democratic Primary. Cann had been appointed by Governor Earl Ray Tomblin to the Senate seat in January 2013 after Joe Minard stepped down to become Senate clerk. Cann had served 18 years in the House of Delegates prior to the appointment. After beating Cann 56-44%, Romano beat former state Delegate Mike Queen in the November general election.

References

1961 births
Living people
Politicians from Clarksburg, West Virginia
County commissioners in West Virginia
West Virginia lawyers
Democratic Party West Virginia state senators
West Virginia University alumni
West Virginia University College of Law alumni
21st-century American politicians
Lawyers from Clarksburg, West Virginia